Laslovo  is a village in Croatia. It is connected by the D518 highway.

Laslovo is mentioned in historical documents in 1475 as a fortress. In Laslovo, the Calvinist church was built in 1404. In the first population census in 1697, after liberation from the Turks, Laslovo had 10 houses. 

The village has a percentage of ethnic Hungarians among its population.

References

Populated places in Osijek-Baranja County
Hungarian-speaking territorial units in Croatia